The Vikramaditya Statue is a 30 feet statue of Indian King Vikramaditya at Vikram Teela behind Mahakal Temple in  the Indian holy city of Ujjain, Madhya Pradesh. The statue would be sculpted by Indore based sculptor Mahendra Kodwani.

See also 
 Statue of Equality (disambiguation)
 Statue of Unity

References

Monuments and memorials in Madhya Pradesh
Buildings and structures in Ujjain
Colossal statues in India
Tourist attractions in Ujjain
Bronze sculptures in India
Memorials to Vikramaditya
Outdoor sculptures in India
2016 sculptures
2016 establishments in Madhya Pradesh